Brett Veach (born December 19, 1977) is an American football executive who is the general manager of the Kansas City Chiefs of the National Football League (NFL). Prior to being the Chiefs general manager, he was the Chiefs' co-director of player personnel. He began his career as an assistant for the Philadelphia Eagles in 2004, eventually moving up and becoming a scout.

Early years
Veach attended the University of Delaware, where he also played college football. From 1998 to 2001, he played running back, wide receiver, and return specialist for the Fightin' Blue Hens. Veach's teammates included quarterback Matt Nagy, whom Veach would later invite to join the Eagles in 2009 and the two would follow Eagles head coach Andy Reid to the Chiefs in 2013.

Executive career

Philadelphia Eagles
In 2004, Veach began his career as a coaching intern with the Philadelphia Eagles under head coach Andy Reid. In 2008, he was promoted to coaches' assistant.

In 2010, Veach shifted to the Eagles' scouting department and became a scout.

Kansas City Chiefs
In 2013, Veach followed Andy Reid to the Kansas City Chiefs and was hired as a pro and college personnel analyst. In 2015, Veach was promoted to co-director of player personnel. 

According to Reid, between that time Veach had begun “pushing” a freshman college QB playing for Texas Tech named Patrick Mahomes. Reid recalls Veach sending him game film and stating at one point that Mahomes was “the best he’d ever seen”, despite it being years before Mahomes would be eligible for the NFL Draft.  

The Chiefs did eventually select Patrick Mahomes in the 2017 NFL Draft. Shortly after, on July 10, 2017, Veach was named General Manager of the Kansas City Chiefs following the firing of John Dorsey. Under his leadership, the Chiefs have won six AFC West championships, three AFC Championships, and two Super Bowls (Super Bowl LIV and Super Bowl LVII).

Personal life
Veach and his wife, Alison, have three children together.

References

External links
 Kansas City Chiefs profile

1977 births
Living people
American football wide receivers
American football return specialists
American football running backs
Sportspeople from Pennsylvania
Delaware Fightin' Blue Hens football players
Kansas City Chiefs executives
Kansas City Chiefs scouts
National Football League general managers
Philadelphia Eagles coaches
Philadelphia Eagles scouts